Koda Kumi Driving Hit's 9: Special Edition is the eleventh remix album released by Japanese singer-songwriter Koda Kumi, and ninth in the Driving Hit's series – the others being Koda Kumi Remix Album (2006) and Beach Mix (2012). The album was released on February 20, 2019, and peaked at No. 24 on the Oricon Albums Chart.

The album was released as a 3-disc set, with the first disc containing remixes from her studio album DNA, and second and third discs containing various songs from previous remix albums.

Information
Koda Kumi Driving Hit's 9: Special Edition is the ninth Driving Hit's remix album released by Koda, and eleventh overall remix album. It debuted at No. 24 for the week.

The album was released as a three-disc set, with limited editions containing special goods, including a sun visor organizer pouch. 

Many of the songs on the first disc contained remixes of songs from her 2018 studio album DNA, with only three of the fifteen tracks being remixes of prior songs. Those included were "Someday" from Best: Second Session (2006), and "I'll Be There" and "Koi no Tsubomi" from Black Cherry (2006). Artist Remo-Con became responsible for editing the songs on discs two and three into a non-stop mix. The album had two separate remixes of "Hush", track No. 2 from DNA.

While various songs from previous Driving Hit's albums were included, only one song was pulled from her first in the series, Koda Kumi Driving Hit's (2010): the Prog5 Mirrorball Remix of her 2005 song "Butterfly". Twelve remix artists performed for the album, including KATFYR, Yuto, both who worked with Koda on her prior remix album, Joe Iron, iamSHUM and Litefeet.

Track listing

Charts

References

2019 remix albums
Japanese-language remix albums
Koda Kumi albums
Rhythm Zone remix albums